Mashour bin Saud Al Saud (1954 – 21 November 2004) was a member of House of Saud and one of the children of King Saud who ruled Saudi Arabia between 1953 and 1964.

Early life
Prince Mashour was born in Riyadh in 1954. He was a son of King Saud and Terkiyah Mohammed Al Abdulaziz.

He began his education at King Abdulaziz school in Riyadh. He left the Kingdom with his cousin, Prince Khalid bin Faisal Al Saud, for the United States and studied at the Institute of George Washington. He received a bachelor's degree in political science at the University of California.

Visit to the United States, 1957
In 1957, King Saud made an official visit to Washington, D.C. carrying his three-year-old son, Prince Mashour who was suffering an illness. U.S President Dwight D. Eisenhower tasked his personal physician to look after him at Walter Reed Hospital.

Activities
In 1985, Prince Mashour was charged with conspiring to smuggle cocaine into Britain and spent two weeks in jail before he was granted 150,000 pound sterling bail at the high court in London. Bail was refused after the prosecution told the court that Mashour had no diplomatic immunity and was ordered to report twice a week to police until his trial. In April 1986, Prince Mashour was found guilty after admitting possession of cocaine and told the court he spent about 500,000 dollars a year on cocaine, and high standard of living.

Personal life and death
Prince Mashour was married to Princess Fatima Kurdi and they had three children: a son, Prince Bandar, and two daughters Princesses Bayan and Al Bandari.

Prince Mashour died on 21 November 2004.

References

External links

Mashour
Mashour
1954 births
2004 deaths
Mashour
Mashour
University of California alumni